Touching may refer to:

Touch, a sensation processed by the somatosensory system
Physical intimacy

Music
Touching (Paul Bley album), 1965
Touching (Eric Alexander album), 2012

Other
T,O,U,C,H,I,N,G, Paul Sharits film, 1968